Samuel Henry Prior (10 January 1869 – 6 June 1933), was an Australian journalist, manager and editor of The Bulletin.

Prior was educated at Glenelg Grammar School and the Bendigo School of Mines and Industries, Victoria. He became a teacher but soon joined the Bendigo Independent as a mining reporter.
Prior briefly edited the Broken Hill Times and its successor, the Broken Hill Argus. For fourteen years from around 1889 he edited The Barrier Miner.

Prior had ambitions as a financial journalist and sent pieces to the Sydney Bulletin. Jules François Archibald was so impressed that he invited Prior to join the staff. Prior accepted and took over from James Edmond as financial editor in 1903. In 1912 Prior became associate editor; in 1914 when Archibald sold his Bulletin interests to Prior, he became a major shareholder. In 1915 Prior became senior editor.
Prior became both manager and editor in 1927 when William Macleod sold his shareholding to him.

Prior died in Mosman, New South Wales.

See also
 S. H. Prior Memorial Prize

References

1869 births
1933 deaths
Australian journalists
People from Adelaide
Australian newspaper editors